Bilikol is a freshwater lake in the Zhambyl Region, Kazakhstan.

Its waters are used by the surrounding communities to irrigate crops.

Geography
Lake Bilikol has a shape that roughly reminds of an hourglass. Lying in a tectonic depression on the northern slope of the Karatau Mountains, it is part of the Talas basin. The Asa river flows through the lake entering it from the east and flowing out from the north. The shores of the lake are sandy in places.

Flora and fauna 
Reeds grow on the lakeshore. The main fish species found in the lake are carp, common bream and grass carp, among others.

See also
List of lakes of Kazakhstan

References

External links

Озеро Биликоль высыхает
Биликоль озеро в Жамбылской области, Казахстан
Как спасти озеро Биликоль в Жамбылской области

Lakes of Kazakhstan
Jambyl Region

kk:Билікөл